Giacomo Carlini (2 August 1904 – 2 August 1963) was an Italian sprinter, hurdler and a specialist in combined events.

Biography
He competed in two editions of the Summer Olympics (1928 and 1932).

Olympic results

National titles
Giacomo Carlini has won 11 times the individual national championship.
1 win in the 400 metres (1933)
3 wins in the 110 metres hurdles (1927, 1928, 1929)
6 wins in the pentathlon (1925, 1926, 1927, 1928, 1929, 1930)
2 wins in the decathlon (1927, 1930)

See also
 Italy national relay team

References

External links
 
 

1904 births
1963 deaths
Italian male hurdlers
Italian decathletes
Italian male pentathletes
Italian male sprinters
Olympic athletes of Italy
Athletes (track and field) at the 1928 Summer Olympics
Athletes (track and field) at the 1932 Summer Olympics
Italian Athletics Championships winners